Any Given Day is a German metalcore band formed in 2012 in Gelsenkirchen.

History 
The band was formed in 2012 by singer Dennis Diehl, guitarists Andy Posdziech and Dennis ter Schmitten, bassist Michael Golinski and drummer Raphael Altmann who played in several bands before forming Any Given Day.

In October 2012 they recorded a three-track self-titled demo. All three songs were re-recorded on their debut album My Longest Way Home, which was released worldwide in September 2014 via Redfield Records. The album peaked on No. 28 in the German album charts and lasted there for one week. To promote the album the band toured in four cities in Germany: Munich, Bochum, Stuttgart and Berlin.

In January 2014, the band toured with Caliban for three shows and with Sonic Syndicate in September.

In the beginning of 2015 they again supported Caliban on their Ghost Empire Tour along with Bury Tomorrow and Dream On, Dreamer.

In 2016, the band recorded a song entitled "Arise" with singer and guitarist Matt Heafy of Trivium.

In 2019 they released their third studio album “Overpower” with songs such as “Savior” and “Taking over me”.

Musical style 
Metal Hammer categorized Any Given Day as being metalcore and deathcore, with elements of progressive metal, djent and groove metal; furthermore with an emotional twist, they have been compared to Slipknot and Suicide Silence.

Members
 Dennis Diehl – lead vocals
 Andy Posdziech – lead guitar
 Michael Golinski – bass, backing vocals 
 Dennis ter Schmitten – rhythm guitar, backing vocals
 Leon Stiller – drums

Discography

Albums

Singles 
 Home Is Where The Heart Is (2013)
 Home Is Where The Heart Is (Acoustic) (2014)
 Endurance (2016)
 Arise (2016)
 Levels (2016)
 Savior (2018)
 Loveless (2018)
 Lonewolf (2019)
 Apocalypse (2022)
 Wind of Change (2022)
 Diamonds (2022)

Demos 
 Any Given Day (2012)

External links

References 

German metalcore musical groups
Musical quintets
Arising Empire artists